Pinckneyville Correctional Center is a medium disciplinary-security Illinois state prison located in the town of Pinckneyville in Perry County. 

Pinckneyville first opened its doors in 1998, the facility consists of five general population housing units. As well as a reception unit, segregation, administration, health care unit.

References 

Prisons in Illinois
1998 establishments in Illinois
Buildings and structures in Perry County, Illinois